Samaroo is an Indian surname. Notable people with the surname include:

Adesh Samaroo, Trinidad and Tobago musician
Amanda Samaroo (born 1992), Trinidad and Tobago cricketer
Jit Samaroo (1950–2016), Trinidad and Tobago composer and musician
Sookval Samaroo (1912–1987), Trinidadian cricketer

Indian surnames
Surnames of Indian origin
Hindustani-language surnames
Hindu surnames